Shae Sortwell (born August 3, 1985) is an American Republican politician. He is a member of the Wisconsin State Assembly, representing the 2nd Assembly district since 2019.

Political career

Local politics
After serving on the Green Bay, Wisconsin, city council in 2010, Sortwell introduced an online petition in 2016 asking mayor Jim Schmitt to resign over criminal campaign finance violations. He later joined the Gibson, Wisconsin, Town Board of Supervisors.

Wisconsin State Assembly
Sortwell ran for the Wisconsin State Assembly in 2014, contesting the 90th Assembly District as an independent. In 2018, after incumbent Andre Jacque announced he would not run for reelection, Sortwell declared his candidacy for Wisconsin Assembly District 2. He defeated Dean Raasch in an August primary for the Republican nomination and won the November election over Democrat Mark Grams, garnering 55 percent of the vote.

After Joe Biden won the 2020 presidential election and Donald Trump refused to concede, Sortwell made false claims of fraud in the election and urged Congress not to certify the election results.

Personal life
Sortwell graduated from the University of Wisconsin-Green Bay in 2006. He formerly was a sergeant in the U. S. Army.
In 2021, he compared a children's museum in central Wisconsin to Nazi Germany because it continued to require unvaccinated people to wear masks by writing "The Gestapo wants to see your papers, please" on Facebook regarding the museum's decision, drawing ire.

In autumn of 2021, controversy emerged around allegations that Sortwell abused his child after the child was found to have bruises. The investigation conducted by "four police officers, two social workers, a child forensic officer -a trained agent who interviews child victims of physical and sexual abuse -a child advocacy staff member and a nurse practitioner," resulted in law enforcement referring the incident to the district attorney  However, Deputy District Attorney Dana J. Johnson decided not to pursue charges, citing "the defense of the parent using reasonable force to discipline the child." Sortwell told officers he and his wife disciplined their child with an object when he was being “defiant” because they are commanded to in the Bible.

Electoral history

| colspan="6" style="text-align:center;background-color: #e9e9e9;"| General Election

| colspan="6" style="text-align:center;background-color: #e9e9e9;"| Primary Election

| colspan="6" style="text-align:center;background-color: #e9e9e9;"| General Election

References

External links
 
 

Living people
1985 births
University of Wisconsin–Green Bay alumni
Republican Party members of the Wisconsin State Assembly
21st-century American politicians